Actia mongolica is an eastern Palearctic species of fly in the family Tachinidae.

Distribution
Mongolia and Eastern Siberia.

References

mongolica
Diptera of Asia
Insects described in 1976